Goldhanger is a village and a civil parish on the B1026 road in the Maldon District, in the English county of Essex.

Goldhanger had an agricultural museum and has a church dedicated to St Peter.

There are eight roads in Goldhanger: Head Street, Fish Street, Church Street, St Peter's Close, Maldon Road, Hall Estate, Sorrell Close, and finally Blind Lane.

The village is directly between Maldon and Tolleshunt D'Arcy and also has direct passage to the River Blackwater.

The place-name Goldhanger is first attested in the Domesday Book of 1086, where it appears as Goldhangra. The name means 'slope where marigold grew', from the Old English golde meaning marigold.

Notable people
John Christopher Atkinson (1814-1900), writer and antiquary
Jeremy Bamber (b. 1961), farmer, convicted of the White House Farm murders, lived in Goldhanger

References

External links
Walking around Goldhanger
Goldhanger Argyle Football Club

Villages in Essex
Populated coastal places in Essex
Maldon District